Little Rock Creek is a stream in the U.S. state of Minnesota. It is a tributary of Minnesota River.

Little Rock Creek took its name from an old Native American trading post called Little Rock, or Petite Roche in French.

See also
List of rivers of Minnesota

References

Rivers of Nicollet County, Minnesota
Rivers of Renville County, Minnesota
Rivers of Minnesota